Lucilla scintilla is a species of minute air-breathing land snail, a terrestrial pulmonate gastropod mollusk or micromollusk in the family Helicodiscidae.

Lucilla scintilla is the type species of the genus Lucilla.

Distribution
The indigenous distribution for this species includes North America.

The non-indigenous distribution areas include:
 Czech Republic
 Slovakia
 France

Ecology
This species lives in soil, see soil-inhabitant. Technically this is known as being a terricol species.

References

External links 
 Lucilla scintilla at AninmalBase
  Lucilla scintilla at mollbase.de

Helicodiscidae
Taxa named by Richard Thomas Lowe
Gastropods described in 1852